P. communis may refer to:
 Panorpa communis, the common scorpionfly, a species of scorpionfly native to Western Europe
 Pyrgus communis, the common checkered-skipper, a species of butterfly in the family Hesperiidae
 Pyrus communis, the European pear, a species of pear native to central and eastern Europe and southwest Asia

Synonyms
 Phragmites communis, a synonym for Phragmites australis, the common reed, a large perennial grass found in wetlands throughout temperate and tropical regions of the world

See also
 Communis (disambiguation)